Golf at the 2014 Asian Games was held in Incheon, South Korea from 25 to 28 September 2014. Four competitions were held in both, men and women's.

Medalists

Medal table

Participating nations
A total of 114 athletes from 24 nations competed in golf at the 2014 Asian Games:

References

External links
Golf at the 2014 Asian Games

 
2014 Asian Games events
Asian Games
2014